Uricosuria refers to uric acid in the urine. Urine levels of uric acid can be described as:
Hyperuricosuria, an abnormally high level of uric acid in the urine
Hypouricosuria, an abnormally low level of uric acid in the urine

Agents that increase uric acid in the urine are termed uricosurics.